Mohamed Traoré (born 18 November 1988) is a Malian professional footballer who plays as a forward.

Career
In January 2011 it was announced Traoré would join Swiss Super League side FC Sion from Tunisian club Club Africain for the 2011–12 season. Traoré agreed a four-year contract until June 2015.

Personal life
Traoré was nicknamed "Zorro de Bamako" by Tunisian newspaper "Tunis Hebdo“.

References

External links
 

Living people
1988 births
Sportspeople from Bamako
Association football forwards
Malian footballers
Mali international footballers
2015 Africa Cup of Nations players
Swiss Super League players
Libyan Premier League players
AS Real Bamako players
Club Africain players
Al-Nasr SC (Benghazi) players
FC Sion players
Al-Hilal Club (Omdurman) players
Al-Merrikh SC players
Malian expatriate footballers
Expatriate footballers in Tunisia
Expatriate footballers in Saudi Arabia
Expatriate footballers in Switzerland
Expatriate footballers in Egypt
Expatriate footballers in Libya
Expatriate footballers in Sudan
Malian expatriate sportspeople in Tunisia
Malian expatriate sportspeople in Saudi Arabia
Malian expatriate sportspeople in Switzerland
Malian expatriate sportspeople in Egypt
Malian expatriate sportspeople in Libya
Malian expatriate sportspeople in Sudan
21st-century Malian people